H. Govindaiah (born 1954) is a prominent Dalit poet writing in Kannada. He was associated with Dalit Sangharsha Samiti (DSS) and was the publisher of Panchama, a fortnightly magazine of DSS for ten years until 1985. He has worked as a lecturer at Mysore University and the Karnataka Open University and was Deputy Registrar of the latter for two years.

Further reading 
 Satyanarayana, K & Tharu, Susie (2011) No Alphabet in Sight: New Dalit Writing from South Asia, Dossier 1: Tamil and Malayalam, New Delhi: Penguin Books.
 Satyanarayana, K & Tharu, Susie (2013) From those Stubs Steel Nibs are Sprouting: New Dalit Writing from South Asia, Dossier 2: Kannada and Telugu, New Delhi: HarperCollins India.

References 

1954 births
Dalit writers
Kannada-language writers
Living people